Mamadou Diallo (born 28 August 1971) is a Senegalese former professional footballer who played as a forward. He played in twelve countries across four continents: United States, Senegal, Morocco, Switzerland, Saudi Arabia, Malaysia, South Africa, Mali, Germany, Turkey, Sweden and Norway. A prolific scorer almost everywhere he played, he became a regular for the Senegal national team.

Club career 
Diallo was born in Dakar, Senegal.

Major League Soccer 
Major League Soccer signed Diallo in 2000 and allocated him to the Tampa Bay Mutiny. Diallo exploded on the MLS scene in his first season, combining well with midfield general Carlos Valderrama. Diallo scored 26 goals, the best in the league since Roy Lassiter had 27 in 1996; he was named to the MLS Best XI and was the league Scoring Champion.

However, Diallo is also remembered for the incident on 16 August 2000 in a game against the MetroStars, where he collided with and stepped on Metro goalie Mike Ammann, breaking his ribs and puncturing his lung. The referee saw the collision as unintentional contact, and he was neither fined nor carded for the incident. However, there were those (including Ammann himself) that considered the contact was intentional.

In 2001, with Valderrama traded in mid-season, Diallo had a down year, slipping to nine goals. The Mutiny was contracted after the season and Diallo was selected by the New England Revolution in the 2002 MLS Allocation Draft. He only spent seven games in New England, and was sent over to the MetroStars in a six-player deal on 24 May. He had a four-goal game against the Los Angeles Galaxy in only his second match with the team, but his scoring tapered off and the Metros missed the playoffs.

Later career 
Diallo moved to Saudi Arabian club Al-Ahli on 7 October 2002, but was dropped in November after failing to impress. His globetrotting ways took him to the former UEFA Cup winners, the Swedish club IFK Göteborg, then Malaysian club Pahang, then Jomo Cosmos of South Africa and finally with Djoliba AC until he retired.

International career 
Diallo won 46 caps for Senegal, scoring 21 goals, in a career which saw him represent his country at the African Cup of Nations in 1994. He played for Senegal at the 2007 Beach Soccer World Cup, scoring one goal and receiving one red card.

References

External links 
 
 

1971 births
Living people
Senegalese footballers
Senegal international footballers
1990 African Cup of Nations players
1994 African Cup of Nations players
MSV Duisburg players
Lillestrøm SK players
Vålerenga Fotball players
Tampa Bay Mutiny players
New England Revolution players
New York Red Bulls players
IFK Göteborg players
Zeytinburnuspor footballers
FC St. Gallen players
Djoliba AC players
Sri Pahang FC players
Bundesliga players
Expatriate footballers in Germany
Expatriate soccer players in South Africa
Expatriate footballers in Norway
Expatriate footballers in Malaysia
Expatriate footballers in Turkey
Expatriate footballers in Mali
Expatriate footballers in Switzerland
Expatriate soccer players in the United States
Senegalese expatriate sportspeople in South Africa
Senegalese expatriate sportspeople in Germany
Senegalese expatriate sportspeople in Malaysia
Senegalese expatriate sportspeople in Morocco
Senegalese expatriate sportspeople in the United States
Senegalese expatriate footballers
Botola players
Eliteserien players
Allsvenskan players
Major League Soccer players
Süper Lig players
Footballers from Dakar
Port Autonome players
Major League Soccer All-Stars
Al-Ahli Saudi FC players
Kawkab Marrakech players
Association football forwards
Saudi Professional League players
Swiss Super League players
Senegalese expatriate sportspeople in Switzerland
Senegalese expatriate sportspeople in Mali